The Eastern Development Region (Nepali: पुर्वाञ्चल विकास क्षेत्र, Purwānchal Bikās Kshetra) was one of Nepal's five development regions. It is also known as Kirata region. It was located at the eastern end of the country with its headquarters at Dhankuta. The town of Dhankuta was the headquarter of the Eastern Region, as well as the headquarter of the Dhankuta District.

History
On April 13, 1961 Mahendra, the king of Nepal, divided the existing 35 districts into 75 districts and grouped them into 14 administrative zones.

In 1972, the King of Nepal grouped 14 zones into total 4 development regions, thus Eastern Development Region came into existence.

On 20 September 2015, Eastern Development Region including all other development regions of Nepal were abolished, when the new Constitution of Nepal-2015 was proclaimed. The total area of the region was 28,456 km².

Administrative divisions

The region administratively was divided into 3 zones and 16 districts.
Each zone contained 4 or more districts. Districts were divided into municipalities and village development committees.

Zones
The Eastern Development Region was split into 3 zones:
 Sagarmatha
 Kosi
 Mechi

Districts
The region was made up of the 16 districts. Mechi Zone contained 4 districts whereas 2 other zones Kosi Zone and Sagarmatha Zone contained 6-6 districts.

Municipalities
Before 2014, the total number of municipalities in Nepal was 58, of which 14 municipalities were located in Eastern Development Region.

VDCs
VDCs or Village development committees were local level body ruling in rural (village) area. There were thousands of VDCs in Nepal.

List of VDCs (zonewise)

Mechi Zone

Ilam District
Amchok, Bajho, Barbote, Chamaita, Chisapani, Chulachuli, Danabari, Ebhang, Ektappa, Emang, Erautar, Gajurmukhi, Godak, Gorkhe, Jamuna, Jirmale, Jitpur, Jogmai, Kolbung, Lakshmipur, Lumbe, Mabu, Mahamai, Maimajhuwa, Maipokhari, Namsaling, Naya Bazar, Pashupatinagar, Phakphok, Phuyatappa, Puwamajwa, Pyang, Sakphara, Sakhejung, Samalpung, Sangrumba, Shanti Danda, Shantipur, Siddhithumka, Soyak, Soyang, Sri Antu, Sulubung, Sumbek

Jhapa District
Anarmani, Bahundangi, Baigundhara, Balubari, Baniyani, Budhabare, Chakchaki, Chandragadhi, Charpane, Dangibari, Dhaijan, Dharmpur, Duhagadhi, Garamani, Gauriganj, Gherabari, Goldhhap, Haldibari, Jalthal, Jyamirgadhi, Kechana, Khajurgachhi, Khudunabari, Korobari, Kumarkhod, Lakhanpur, Mahabhara, Maheshpur, Panchganchi, Pathabhari, Pathariya, Prithivinagar, Rajgadh, Shantinagar, Sharanamati, Taghanduba, Topgachchi sanichare

Panchthar District
Ranitar, Luwamphu, Yangnam, Nangin, Lungrupa, Ambarpur, Panchami, Subhang, Bharapa, Yasok, Rani Gaun, Mangjabung, Syabarumba, Aarubote, Sarangdanda, Rabi, Kurumba, Limba, Durdimba, Ektin, Memeng, Prangbung, Yangnam, Sidin, Nawamidanda, Imbung, Pauwa Sartap, Chilingdin, Aangsarang, Phaktep, Aangna, Olane, Hangum, Mauwa, Chyangthapu, Phalaicha, Oyam, Tharpu, Nagi

Taplejung District
Ambegudin, Ankhop, Chaksibote, Change, Dhungesaghu, Dummrise, Ekhabu, Hangdeva, Hangpang, Kalikhola, Khamlung, Khejenim, Khewang, Khokling, Lelep, Limbudin, Lingtep, Linkhim, Liwang, Mamangkhe, Nalbu, Nankholyang, Nidhuradin, Olangchung Gola, Paidang, Papung, Pedang, Phakumba, Phawakhola, Phulbari, Phurumbu, Sadewa, Sangu, Santhakra, Sawa, Sawadin, Sawalakhu, Sikaicha, Sinam, Surumakhim, Tapethok, Tellok, Thechambu, Thinglabu, Thukima, Thumbedin, Tiringe, Yamphudin

Kosi Zone

Bhojpur District
Aamtep, Annapurna, Baikuntha, Basikhola, Basingtharpur, Bastim, Bhubal, Bhulke, Boya, Champe, Changre, Charambi, Chaukidada, Chhinamukh, Dalgaun, Deurali, Dewantar, Dhodalekhani, Dobhane, Dummana, Gogane, Gupteshwar, Gopal, Helauchha, Homtang, Jarayotar, Khairang, Khatamma, Khawa, Kot, Kudak Kaule, Kulunga, Lekharka, Mane Bhanjyang, Nagi, Nepaledanda, Okhre, Pangcha, Patle Pani, Pawala, Pyauli, Ranibas, Sangpang, Sano Dumba, Shyamsila, Siddheshwar, Sindrang, Syamsila, Thidingkha, Thulo Dumba, Timma, Tiwari Bhanjyang, Walangkha, Yaku, Yangpang

Dhankuta District
Ahale, Ankhisalla, Arkhaule Jitpur, Basantatar, Belhara, Budhabare, Bhirgaun, Bodhe, Budhabare, Budi Morang, Chanuwa, Chhintang, Chungmang, Danda Bazar, Dandagaun, Hathikharka, Jitpur Arkhaule, Khoku, Khuwaphok, Kuruletenupa, Leguwa, Mahabharat, Marek Katahare, Maunabuthuk, Mudebas, Murtidhunga, Parewadin, Phaksib, Raja Rani, Tankhuwa, Telia, Vedatar

Morang District
Amaibariyati, Amardaha, Bavanadov, Babiya Birta, Bahuni, Banigama, Baradanga, Bayarban, Bhaudaha, Budhanagar, Dainiya, Dangihat, Dangraha, Darbairiya, Drabesh, Gopal, Hasandaha, Hathimudha, Hoklabari, Itahara, Jante, Jhapa Baijanathpur, Jhorahat, Jhurkiya, Kadamaha, Katahari, Kathamaha, Kerabari, Keroun, Lakhantari, Madhumalla, Mahadeva, Majhare, Matigachha, Motipur, Nocha, Patigaun, Pokhariya, Rajghat, Ramite Khola, Sidharaha, Sijuwa, Sinhadevi Sombare, Sisabanibadahara, Sisawanijahada, Sorabhaj, Tandi, Tankisinuwari, Tetariya, Thalaha, Warangi, Yangshila

Sankhuwasabha District
Ankhibhui, Bahrabise, Bala, Chepuwa, Dhupu, Diding, Hatiya, Jaljala, Kimathanka, Madi Mulkharka, Madi Rambeni, Makalu, Malta, Mamling, Manakamana, Mangtewa, Matsya Pokhari, Mawadin, Num, Nundhaki, Pangma, Pathibhara, Pawakhola, Savapokhari, Sisuwakhola, Sitalpati, Syabun, Tamaphok, Tamku, Yaphu

Sunsari District
Aekamba, Amaduwa, Amahibelaha, Aurabarni, Babiya, Bakalauri, Barahachhetra, Basantapur, Bharaul, Bhokraha, Bishnupaduka, Chadwela, Chhitaha, Chimdi, Dewanganj, Ghuski, Dumaraha, Gautampur, Hanshpokha, Harinagar, Haripur, Jalpapur, Kaptanganj, Khanar, Laukahi, Madheli, Madhesa, Madhuwan, Madhyeharsahi, Mahendranagar, Narshinhatappu, Pakali, Panchakanya, Paschim Kasuha, Prakashpur, Purbakushaha, Ramganj Belgachhi, Ramganj Senuwari, Ramnagar Bhutaha, Sahebganj, Santerjhora, Simariya, Sonapur, Sripurjabdi, Tanamuna

Terhathum District
Angdim, Basantapur, Chhate Dhunga, Chuhandanda, Dangpa, Hamarjung, Hawaku, Isibu, Jaljale, Khamlalung, Morahang, Okhare, Oyakjung, Panchakanya Pokhari, Phakchamara, Phulek, Pauthak, Sabla, Samdu, Sankranti Bazar, Simle, Solma, Sri Jung, Sudap, Sungnam, Thoklung

Sagarmatha Zone

Khotang District
Ainselu Kharka, Arkhale, Badahare, Badka Dipali, Bahunidanda, Bakachol, Baksila, Barahapokhari (VDC), Baspani, Batase, Bijaya Kharka, Buipa, Chhitapokhari, Chhorambu, Chipring, Chisapani, Chyandanda, Chyasmitar, Damarkhu Shivalaya, Dandagaun, Devisthan, Dharapani, Dhitung, Dikuwa, Diplung, Dipsung, Dorpa Chiuridanda, Dubekol, Dumre Dharapani, Durchhim, Hanchaur, Indrayani Pokhari, Jalapa, Jyamire, Kaule, Kharmi, Kharpa, Khartamchha, Khidima, Khotang Bazar, Kuvinde, Lamidanda, Lichki Ramche, Linkuwa Pokhari, Magpa, Mahadevasthan, Mangaltar, Mattim Birta, Mauwabote, Nerpa, Nirmalidanda, Nunthala, Patheka, Pauwasera, Phaktang, Phedi, Rajapani, Rakha Bangdel, Rakha Dipsung, Ratancha Majhagaun, Ribdung Jaleshwari, Ribdung Maheshwari, Salle, Santeshwar Chhitapokhari, Sapteshwar, Saunechaur, Sawakatahare, Simpani, Sungdel, Suntale, Woplukha, Wopung, Yamkhya

Okhaldhunga District
Baksa, Balakhu, Baraneshwar, Betini, Bhadaure, Bhussinga, Bigutar, Bilandu, Chyanam, Diyale, Gamnangtar, Harkapur, Jantarkhani, Kalikadevi, Kaptigaun, Katunje, Ketuke, Khiji Chandeshwari, Khijiphalate, Kuibhir, Kuntadevi, Madhavpur, Mamkha, Manebhanjyang, Moli, Mulkharka, Narmedeshwar, Okhaldhunga, Palapu, Patle, Phediguth, Phulbari, Pokhare, Pokli, Prapchan, Ragani, Rajadip, Raniban, Ratmata, Rawadolu, Serna, Srichaur, Singhadevi, Sisneri, Taluwa, Tarkerabari, Thakle, Thoksela, Thulachhap, Ubu, Vadaure, Yasam

Saptari District
Arnaha, Aurahi, Bainiya, Bairawa, Bakdhauwa, Bamangamakatti, Banarjhula, Banaula, Banauli, Barhmapur, Barsain, Basbiti, Bathnaha, Belhi, Belhi Chapena, Bhagawatpur, Bhardaha, Bhutahi, Birpur Barahi, Bishariya, Budebarsaien, Boriya, Brahmapur, Chhinnamasta, Dauda, Daulatpur, Deuri, Deurimaruwa, Dhanagadi, Didhawa, Diman, Gamhariya Parwaha, Goithi, Hardiya, Hariharpur, Haripur, Inarwa Phulbariya, Itahari Bishnupur, Jamuni Madhapura, Jandaul, Jhutaki, Kabilash, Kachan, Kalyanpur, Kataiya, Khadgapur, Khojpur, Ko. Madhepura, Kochabakhari, Koiladi, Kushaha, Lalapati, Launiya, Lohajara, Madhawapur, Madhupati, Mahadeva, Maina Kaderi, Maina Sahasrabahu, Malekpur, Maleth, Malhanama, Malhaniya, Manraja, Mauwaha, Nargho, Negada, Pakari, Pansera, Parasbani, Paterwa, Pato, Patthargada, Phakira, Pharseth, Phulkahi, Pipra (West), Portaha, Ramnagar, Rampur Malhaniya, Rautahat, Rayapur, Sankarpura, Sarashwar, Simraha Sigiyaun, Siswa Beihi, Sitapur, Tarahi, Terahota, Tikuliya, Tilathi, Trikola

Siraha District
Arnama Lalpur, Arnama Rampur, Aurahi, Badharamal, Barchhawa, Bariyarpatti, Basbita, Bastipur, Belaha, Bhadaiya, Bhagawanpur, Bhagawatipur, Bhawanpur Kalabanchar, Bhokraha, Bishnupur Pra. Ma., Bishnupur Pra. Ra., Brahmagaughadi, Chandra Ayodhyapur, Chatari, Chikana, Devipur, Dhodhana, Dumari, Durgapur, Gadha, Gauripur, Gautari, Govindapur Malahanama, Govindpur Taregana, Hakpara, Hanuman Nagar, Harakathi, Inarwa, Itarhawa, Itari Parsahi, Itatar, Janakinagar, Jighaul, Kabilasi, Kachanari, Kalyanpur Jabadi, Kalyanpur Kalabanchar, Karjanha, Kharukyanhi, Khirauna, Krishnapur Birta, Lagadi Gadiyani, Lagadigoth, Lakshminiya, Lakshmipur (Pra. Ma.), Lakshmipur Patari, Madar, Mahadewa Portaha, Mahanaur, Maheshpur Patari, Majhauliya, Majhaura, Makhanaha, Malhaniya Gamharia, Mauwahi, Media, Nahara Rigaul, Naraha Balkawa, Navarajpur, Padariya Tharutol, Pipra Pra. Dha., Pipra Pra. Pi, Pokharbhinda, Rajpur, Sakhuwanankarkatti, Sanhaitha, Sarashwar, Sikron, Sisawani, Sonmati Majhaura, Sothayan, Sukhachina, Tenuwapati, Thalaha Kataha, Thegahi, Tulsipur

Solukhumbu District
Baku, Bapha, Basa, Beni, Bhakanje, Bung, Chaulakharka, Chaurikharka, Chheskam, Deusa, Goli, Gorakhani, Gudel, Jubing, Jubu, Kaku, Kangel, Kerung, Khumjung, Lokhim, Mabe, Mukali, Namche, Necha Batase, Necha Bedghari, Nele, Panchan, Salyan, Sautang, Takasindu, Tapting, Tingla

Udayapur District
Aaptar, Balaltar, Baraha, Barai, Basabote, Bhumarashuwa, Bhuttar, Chaudandi, Dumre, Hadiya, Hardeni, Iname, Jalpachilaune, Janti, Jogidaha, Katunjebawala, Khanbu, Laphagaun, Lekhani, Lekhgau, Limpatar, Mainamiani, Myakhu, Nametar, Okhale, Panchawati, Pokhari, Rauta, Risku, Rupatar, Saune, Shorung Chabise, Sirise, Sithdipur, Sundarpur, Tamlichha, Tapeshwari, Tawasri, Thanagaun, Thoksila, Valaya Danda, Yayankhu

References

External links
 EasternNepal.com 
 Eastern Development Region
 statoids.com

Development

Former subdivisions of Nepal